The 2019–20 Indian Women's League season was the fourth season of the Indian Women's League, the top division women's professional football league in India. The league started from 24 January 2020 and ended on 14 February 2020 with Gokulam Kerala defeating Kryphsa 3-2 in the final to clinch the title for the first time. Twelve teams participated in the league. All the matches were played in Bangalore Football Stadium, Bengaluru.

AFC Women's Club Championship
The winners of the 2020-21 season would originally get the chance to participate in 2021 edition of AFC Women's Club Championship. But as a backup it was thought if the season is unable to complete or cancelled before the start of the tournament which will be held from October 30 to November 14, the defending champions of 2019-20 season, Gokulam Kerala FC will qualify for the event. Later on 15 July 2021, the All India Football Federation (AIFF) nominated Gokulam Kerala to represent India in the AFC Women’s Club Championship 2020–21 pilot tournament.

Qualifiers
State women's leagues organized by various state federations acted as the qualifier this season. In addition to these, the Rest of India zone champions has been awarded a place in the final round. Gokulam Kerala defeated FC Alakhpura 9–1 over two legs to secure a place in the Group stage.

|+Rest of India Zone

Teams

Team locations

Personnel

Foreign players

Final round

Group stage

Group A

Group B

Knock–out stage

|-
!colspan=4|Semifinals
 
 
|-
!colspan=4|Final
  
|}

Season awards
The awards for the Hero Indian Women's League 2019–20 season:

References

External links
 All India Football Federation.

Indian Women's League
2019–20 in Indian football leagues
Indian Women's League season
Ind